Ameland (West Frisian: It Amelân)  is a municipality and one of the West Frisian Islands off the north coast of the Netherlands. It consists mostly of sand dunes.  It is the third major island of the West Frisians. It neighbours islands Terschelling to the west and Schiermonnikoog to the east. This includes the small Engelsmanplaat and Rif sandbanks to the east.

Ameland is, counted from the west, the fourth inhabited Dutch Wadden island and belongs to the Friesland (Fryslân) province. The whole island falls under one municipality, which carries the same name. The Wadden islands form the border between the North Sea and the Wadden Sea, which lies on the south side of the island file. The inhabitants are called Amelanders.

Places 
The island has four villages, and one small part-village.

There were two other villages: Oerd and Sier, but these were flooded and now lie in the sea. The name of these villages live on in MS Oerd and MS Sier, which are the names of the ferries to the island. From west to east:
 Hollum, the most populated village, located on the west coast, home to the island's lighthouse
 Ballum, smallest village, location of the island's airfield, Ameland Airport
 Nes, the second largest of the island, a vibrant tourist village with many hotels, also home to Burgemeester Waldaschool (the island's secondary school), and ferry services from Holwerd mainland
 Buren, located at the centre of the island, includes Ameland's beach

Population 
The population of each village of the island :

History 
First mentioned as Ambla in the eighth century, it paid tribute to the county of Holland until in 1424 its lord, Ritske Jelmera, declared it a "free lordship" (vrijheerschap).

Although Holland, Friesland and the Holy Roman Emperor contested this quasi-independent status, it remained a free lordship until the ruling family, Cammingha, died out in 1708. After that, the Frisian stadtholder John William Friso, Prince of Orange, became lord of Ameland and after him, his son the stadtholder of all the Netherlands, William IV, Prince of Orange, and his grandson, William V, Prince of Orange.

Only in the constitution of 1813 was the island finally integrated into the Netherlands into the province of Friesland. The monarchy of the Netherlands still maintain the title Vrijheer van Ameland today.

In 1871 and 1872, a dike was built between Ameland and the mainland by a society for the reclamation of Frisian land from the sea. The province and the Dutch realm each paid 200,000 guilders. In the end, it was unsuccessful; the dike did not prove to be durable and in 1882, after heavy storms in the winter, repair and maintenance of the dam were stopped. The dike can still be partially seen at low tide. The dam at Holwerd is the beginning of this dike.

In 1940 German troops were ferried to the island and within hours Ameland was under the control of the German Army. Because of its limited military value the Allies never invaded Ameland. The German forces on the island did not surrender until June 2, 1945, almost a full month after the defeat of Nazi Germany.

Nature 
Like all West and East Frisian Islands, Ameland is a unique piece of nature. The profusion of different plants on the island is caused by the immense variety of landscapes. One of the scenic areas is the Oerd, a large complex of dunes which is still expanding by the year. Because of the differing landscapes and types of flora, over 60 different species of birds are sitting there every year. At the eastern part of the Oerd lies a beach plain called the Hon.
Besides dunes and beaches, Ameland has some woods, like the Nesser bos ("Wood of Nes").

Transport
Most travelers reach the island by ferry from Holwerd in the mainland of Friesland, but there is also an airport near Ballum (Ameland Airport). A bus service connects the ferries from Hollum/Ballum (route 130) and Buren/Nes (route 132). When the sea between Friesland and Ameland is low tide one can walk across (see mudflat hiking).

Notable people

The following people were born on Ameland:
 Ritske Jelmera (1383 in Ternaard – 1450) a Frisian chieftain who ruled the island of Ameland 
  , whaler
 Johannes de Jong (1885 in Nes – 1955), Archbishop of Utrecht 1936/1955
 Hannes de Boer (1899 in Hollum – 1982), long jumper, participated in the 1924 and 1928 Olympic Games
 Sjoerd Soeters (born 1947 in Nes), postmodern architect
 Pieter Mosterman (born 1967 in Nes), a research Scientist and academic in the USA 
 Jan Bruin (born 1969 in Hollum), retired Dutch soccer player.

Gallery

References

External links 

Official website
The history of Ameland

 
Municipalities of Friesland
Islands of Friesland
West Frisian Islands
Ramsar sites in the Netherlands